Anton Emil Titl (2 October 1809 – 21 January 1882) was an Austrian composer and conductor. In Vienna he was Kapellmeister at the Theater in der Josefstadt and later at the Hofburgtheater.

Life
Titl was born in Nedvědice in Moravia, at that time part of the Austrian Empire; it is the location of Pernštejn Castle, where his father served as burgrave for Count Wilhelm Mitrovský. After his father's death when he was 14, the Count sent him to  Frankstadt (now Nový Malín) to be trained as a teacher. At age 17 he moved to Brǜnn (Brno) to continue his training, but preferred to attend music classes of Gottfried Rieger; he also played in the orchestra of the civic theatre in the town.

Early compositions
He composed an overture to Goethe's play Torquato Tasso, and a symphony, which were well received in Brǜnn and Vienna.  of Olmütz (Olomouc) wrote for him the libretto for an opera Die Burgfrau auf dem Schlosse Pernstein (1829), the first opera on a Moravian subject. It was performed successfully in  Olmütz and Brǜnn. He wrote a mass in 1832 for the enthronement of prince-bishop  at Olmütz, which was performed in Prague and Vienna.

For a few years he was a teacher in Olmütz, also composing songs and piano pieces, which were published; his "Gondellied" ("Gondola song") became popular.

Prague and Vienna
In 1835 Titl was appointed conductor of a military band in Prague. In 1840 he succeeded Heinrich Proch as Kapellmeister at the Theater in der Josefstadt in Vienna, which was under the management of Franz Pokorny. He composed music for the plays performed there, including many plays by Franz Xaver Told, of which Der Zauberschleier was very successful. His biographer in Allgemeine Deutsche Biographie (1894) wrote: "Often enough, he was obliged to save the life of weak farces with 'appealing' music...."

From 1850 he was Kapellmeister at the Hofburgtheater in Vienna, and composer of music for plays performed there, writing incidental music and about 50 overtures. He retired from the Hofburgtheater in 1870. Soon afterwards he wrote music for Franz Grillparzer's trilogy of plays . Titl died in Vienna in 1882.

References

External links
 

1809 births
1882 deaths
People from Brno-Country District
19th-century Austrian composers
Austrian conductors (music)